Redemption is the second album by Swedish death metal band Vomitory. It was released in 1999 on Metal Blade.

Track listing 
 "The Voyage" – 5:02
 "Forty Seconds Bloodbath" – 3:48
 "Forever in Gloom" – 2:51
 "Heaps of Blood" – 4:37
 "Embraced by Pain" – 3:45
 "Redemption" – 4:11
 "Ashes of Mourning Life" – 4:26
 "Partly Dead" – 4:31

Personnel
 Erik Rundqvist – bass guitar
 Tobias Gustafsson – drums
 Ulf Dalegren – guitar
 Urban Gustafsson – guitar
 Jussi Linna – vocals
Jan-Tryggve Axelsson – guitar ("Ashes of Mourning Life")
Henrik Larsson – production
Peter "Wölf" Wallgren – artwork
Micke Sörensen – photography

References 

1999 albums
Vomitory (band) albums
Metal Blade Records albums